Salam Fayyad (born 1951 or 12 April 1952) is a Jordanian-Palestinian politician, who served as the prime minister of the Palestinian Authority and the finance minister.

He was Finance Minister from June 2002 to November 2005 and from March 2007 to May 2012. Fayyad was Prime Minister between June 2007 and June 2013.

Fayyad resigned from the cabinet in November 2005 to run as founder and leader of the new Third Way party for the legislative elections of 2006. The party was not successful, and Fayyad returned as Finance Minister in the March 2007 Unity Government. Fayyad's first appointment as Prime Minister on 15 June 2007, which was justified by Palestinian president Mahmoud Abbas on the basis of "national emergency", was not confirmed by the Palestinian Legislative Council. His successor, Rami Hamdallah, was named on 2 June 2013.

Fayyad is a visiting senior scholar and the Daniella Lipper Coules '95 Distinguished Visitor in Foreign Affairs at the Princeton School of Public and International Affairs at Princeton University.

Early life and education
Salam Fayyad was born in Nablus or Deir al-Ghusun in northern West Bank on 12 April 1952 (according to some sources in 1951). He graduated from the American University of Beirut in 1975 and received his MBA from St. Edward's University in 1980. Fayyad has a PhD in economics, which he received from the University of Texas at Austin, where he was a student of William Barnett and did early research on the American Divisia Monetary Aggregates, which he continued on the staff of the Federal Reserve Bank of St. Louis.

Career

Fayyad began his teaching career at Yarmouk University in Jordan. He then worked at the World Bank in Washington from 1987 to 1995 and from 1996 to 2001 as the International Monetary Fund's representative to Palestine based in Jerusalem.

Fayyad served as the regional manager of the Arab Bank in the West Bank and Gaza until he accepted an offer to become Yasser Arafat's Finance Minister in the Palestinian Authority Government of June 2002. He held this post until November 2005, when he resigned from the cabinet to run as founder and leader of the new Third Way party in the legislative elections of 2006 alongside Hanan Ashrawi and Yasser Abd Rabbo. The party yielded little success and only Fayyad and Ashrawi won their seats with only 2.41% of the popular vote. On 17 March 2007, Fayyad was again appointed Finance Minister, this time in the Fatah-Hamas unity government.

On 15 June 2007, following Hamas' takeover of Gaza, Fayyad was appointed Prime Minister of a disputed emergency government, appointed by President Abbas. It was a government without any Fatah or Hamas members, supported by Fatah, Israel and the West. This appointment was challenged as illegal, because it was not approved by the Legislative Council as required by the Palestinian Basic Law.

End February 2009, Hamas and Fatah started a new round of talks in Cairo. On 7 March 2009, Salam Fayyad submitted his resignation to pave the way for the formation of a national unity government. Eventually, the negotiations broke down. On 19 May 2009, Fayyad was reappointed as PM in a new government without Hamas.

On 14 February 2011, Fayyad tendered his government's resignation, two days after PLO negotiator Saeb Erekat had resigned over the leakage of the Palestine Papers, and one day after Abbas had unilaterally called for elections before September, without approval by Hamas. Abbas immediately asked Fayyad to form a new cabinet. Both, Fatah and Hamas declared themselves against the plan of Fayyad to form a unity government. On 4 May, however, Abbas and Khaled Meshal signed the Cairo agreement to form a transitional government of technocrats to prepare for legislative and presidential elections. In June, the negotiations were postponed indefinitely and Abbas changed the focus on a bid for UN recognition for Palestinian statehood in September 2011, instead of forming a unity government. Abbas expressed his concern over a government with any Hamas involvement because of the international opposition to such a government. Pending further Fatah–Hamas negotiations, Fayyad remained PM of the caretaker government.

Following the February 2012 Doha agreement and the successive May 2012 Cairo accord, which also failed to be implemented, Mahmoud Abbas asked Fayyad to form a new Cabinet, without Hamas' involvement. On 16 May 2012, a reshuffled Cabinet saw the light. Fayyad gave up his post as Finance Minister in favour of Nabeel Kassis. The PA faced an estimated financing gap of about $500 million. Eight new ministers were added to the new 21-member cabinet, while two ministers were replaced.

On 3 March 2013, Finance Minister Kassis resigned amid deepening economic malaise in the West Bank. The PA faced a huge budget deficit due to insufficient donor funds and financial sanctions regularly imposed by Israel to punish them, and salary payments for some 150,000 PA employees were delayed. Kassis also questioned the state-building agenda adopted by the PA under Fayyad's leadership. On 13 April 2013, PM Fayyad resigned again. Abbas accepted his resignation but asked him to remain as interim prime minister of the Palestinian Authority until a new government could be formed. He resigned because of political differences between him and Abbas over economic policy. On 6 June 2013, Fayyad was replaced by Rami Hamdallah, who became PM of the Palestinian Authority Governments of 2013.

In September 2017, The Middle East Initiative (MEI) at Harvard Kennedy School's Belfer Center for Science and International Affairs announced that Salam Fayyad, former Prime Minister of the Palestinian Authority, will join the Harvard Kennedy School (HKS) community as a Senior Fellow this academic year. As a Senior Fellow, Fayyad will deliver several public and closed addresses, engage with Harvard Kennedy School students, faculty, and affiliates, and participate in various events and activities at MEI, HKS and the broader Harvard campus.

Reform plans, Fayyadism 
Between 2007 and 2013, Fayyad introduced as Prime Minister some national reform plans, in media sometimes referred to as "Fayyadism". In 2008, he launched his "Palestinian Reform and Development Plan 2008–2010" (PRDP), a West Bank First strategy, aimed to isolate and weaken Hamas in Gaza by developing the West Bank over Gaza, in compliance with American and Israeli desires. It was based on both firm control by the PA security and a market-based (some would say neoliberal) economic agenda. In 2009 followed the Reform and Development Plan, called "Palestine: Ending the Occupation, Establishing the State". In 2011, he introduced the subsequent National Development Plan 2011–2013: Establishing the State, Building our Future.

A major component of Fayyad's plans was modernizing and professionalizing of the Palestinian Security Services under the banner of 'One Homeland, One Flag, and One Law'.

2009–2010 reform plans 
On 23 August 2009, Fayyad came out with a plan to reform of the fundamental infrastructures of a Palestinian State, called "Palestine: Ending the Occupation, Establishing the State", in which he detailed a two-year working plan for reinforcing the institutions of the future Palestinian State. This included, among other elements, a separation of powers, a free market, the development of existing infrastructure, and the building of new infrastructure such as government offices, a stock market, and an airport, all with the purpose of establishing a "de facto Palestinian State," based on the premise that the peace talks with Israel were faltering.

In October 2010, The New York Review of Books published an article by Nathan Thrall on Fayyad's security strategy. At the center are "special battalions" of the National Security Forces (NSF), referred to by Hamas as "the Dayton forces". The officer in charge of the vetting, training, equipping, and strategic planning of these special battalions was Lieutenant General Keith Dayton, the United States security coordinator (USSC) for Israel and the Palestinian Authority. Security cooperation between Israel and Palestine reached unprecedented levels in the West Bank. Together they have largely disbanded Fatah's al-Aqsa Martyrs Brigades, attacked Islamic Jihad groups, and all but eliminated Hamas's social institutions, financial arrangements, and military activities in the West Bank.

Views of Salam Fayyad

Views on Palestinian statehood

Fayyad has rejected calls for a binational state and unilateral declaration of statehood:

On 29 June 2011, in contravention of the Palestinian Authority's official position, and that of president Mahmoud Abbas, Fayyad expressed skepticism about its approach to the United Nations for a vote on statehood, saying it would be only a symbolic victory.

Views on religion

In 2007, Fayyad was quoted by Forbes:

Opinions about Salam Fayyad
Fayyad won international and domestic approval for his management of the West Bank. The World Bank credited him with making substantial improvements in Palestinian state institutions.

Thomas Friedman, an American columnist, praised Fayyad for trying to build functioning institutions of a Palestinian state, and not focusing on Israel. Unlike Yasser Arafat, Fayyad "calls for the opposite—for a nonviolent struggle, for building non-corrupt transparent institutions and effective police and paramilitary units, which even the Israeli Army says are doing a good job; and then, once they are all up and running, declare a Palestinian state in the West Bank by 2011."

He has condemned violence against Israel as detrimental to Palestinian national aspirations, stated that Palestinian refugees could be resettled not in Israel but in a future Palestinian state, and suggested that this state would offer citizenship to Jews.

See also
 Divisia monetary aggregates index

References

External links

Building a Thriving Economy and a Strong Democracy. Lecture by Fayyad at Palestine Center in Washington, DC, April 2007 
Palestinian Basic Law, selection of links and news

Articles
 (English)
Salam Fayyad: Everyone's favorite Palestinian, Haaretz, 1 April 2007
Green Shoots in Palestine by Thomas Friedman, The New York Times, 4 August 2009
Palestine Ending the Occupation, Establishing the State, Ynet, 25 August 2009
How Salam Fayyad Will Save Palestine--Or Not. Kevin Peraino, Newsweek, 4 September 2009. highbeam

1951 births
1952 births
Living people
St. Edward's University alumni
University of Texas at Austin College of Liberal Arts alumni
People from Deir al-Ghusun
People from Nablus
Palestinian Muslims
Academic staff of Yarmouk University
Third Way (Palestinian Authority) politicians
Government ministers of the Palestinian National Authority
Prime Ministers of the Palestinian National Authority
Foreign ministers of the Palestinian National Authority
Finance ministers of the Palestinian National Authority
Prime Ministers of Palestine
Members of the 2006 Palestinian Legislative Council